The Jammu and Kashmir Awami National Conference was founded by former chief minister of Jammu and Kashmir Ghulam Mohammad Shah after his split with the Jammu and Kashmir National Conference. It is currently headed by his wife Khalida Begum, with his son as vice president. It is part of the Gupkar Alliance. Candidates from the group ran in DDC elections. The party was founded in the year 1984, as "National Conference (Khalida)". It was a break-away faction of the Jammu and Kashmir National Conference (JKNC), which allied with Indian National Congress to form a government under the leadership of G. M. Shah as the chief minister.

Members 
Begum Khalida Shah (president)

References

Politics of Jammu and Kashmir